Desperate Moment is a 1951 thriller novel by the German writer Martha Albrand, then living in the United States. It takes place in postwar Europe where a man breaks out of prison to try and find the men who set him up.

Film adaptation
In 1953 it was made into a British film of the same title directed by Compton Bennett and starring Dirk Bogarde, Mai Zetterling and Albert Lieven.

References

Bibliography
 Goble, Alan. The Complete Index to Literary Sources in Film. Walter de Gruyter, 1999.
 Reilly, John M. Twentieth Century Crime & Mystery Writers. Springer, 2015.

1951 American novels
1951 German novels
Novels by Martha Albrand
German thriller novels
Novels set in Germany
German novels adapted into films
Random House books